Climax or Klimax was a town on the Black Sea coast of ancient Paphlagonia between Cytorus and Cape Carambis (modern Kerembe Burnu). Marcian of Heraclea places it 50 stadia east of Crobialus. Ptolemy mentions it in his Galatia, and it is the first place after Cytorus which he mentions on this coast. It flourished during Roman and Byzantine eras.

Its site is located near Kazallı in Asiatic Turkey.

References

Populated places in ancient Paphlagonia
Former populated places in Turkey
History of Kastamonu Province
Roman towns and cities in Turkey
Populated places of the Byzantine Empire